Dhirubhai Naranbhai Patel (born on 13 March 1960) is an Indian judge. Presently, he is serving as the Chairperson of Telecom Disputes Settlement and Appellate Tribunal. He is former Chief Justice of Delhi High Court. He has also served as Acting Chief Justice of Jharkhand High Court and Judge of Jharkhand High Court and Gujarat High Court.

Career 
Patel holds M.Sc. and L.L.M. degrees. He was born on 13 March 1960. He was enrolled as an advocate on 27 July 1984 and practiced in the Gujarat High Court at Ahmedabad. He was appointed an Additional Judge of the Gujarat High Court on 7 March 2004 and Permanent Judge on 25 January 2006. He was transferred as a judge of the Jharkhand High Court on 3 February 2009. He was appointed Acting Chief Justice of the Jharkhand High Court on 24 May 2019. He was elevated as Chief Justice of Delhi High Court on 7 June 2019. He retired on 12 March 2022. He was appointed Chairperson of Telecom Disputes Settlement and Appellate Tribunal on 14 March 2022.

References

Living people
Indian judges
1960 births
Judges of the Jharkhand High Court
Chief Justices of the Delhi High Court
Judges of the Gujarat High Court